Gornji Neradovac is a village in Serbia situated in the municipality of Vranje, district of Pčinja. In 2002, it had 326 inhabitants.

See also
 List of cities, towns and villages in Serbia
 List of settlements in Serbia (alphabetic)

External links

  Satellite view of Gornji Neradovac
  Gornji Neradovac

Populated places in Pčinja District